Ur-dukuga, written dur-du6-kù-ga, ca. 1767 BC – 1764 BC (short chronology) or ca. 1830–1828 BC (middle chronology), was the 13th king of the Dynasty of Isin and reigned for 4 years according to the Sumerian King List, 3 years according to the Ur-Isin kinglist. He was the third in a sequence of short reigning monarchs whose filiation was unknown and whose power extended over a small region encompassing little more than the city of Isin and its neighbor Nippur. He was probably a contemporary of Warad-Sîn of Larsa and Apil-Sîn of Babylon.

Biography

He credited Dāgan, a god from the middle Euphrates region who had possibly been introduced by the dynasty’s founder, Išbi-Erra, with his creation, in cones commemorating the construction of the deity’s temple, the Etuškigara, or the house “well founded residence,” an event also celebrated in a year-name. The inscription describes him as the “shepherd who brings everything for Nippur, the supreme farmer of the gods An and Enlil, provider of the Ekur…” This heaps profuse declarations of his care for Nippur’s sanctuaries, the Ekur for Enlil, the Ešumeša for Ninurta and the Egalmaḫ for Gula, Ninurta’s divine wife.

A piece of brick from Isin, bears his titulary but the event it marked has not been preserved. A cone shaft memorializes the building of a temple of Lulal of the cultic city of Dul-edena, northeast of Nippur on the Iturungal canal. The digging of the Imgur-Ninisin canal was celebrated in another year-name.

External links
Ur-dukuga year-names at CDLI.

Inscriptions

References

Amorite kings
19th-century BC Sumerian kings
18th-century BC Sumerian kings
Dynasty of Isin
19th-century BC people
18th-century BC people